Sophie Louise Ingle  (born 2 September 1991) is a Welsh footballer who plays for the FA WSL club Chelsea and is the captain of the Wales national team. She has previously represented Bristol Academy, Cardiff City, and Liverpool. Ingle plays as either a defender or defensive midfielder.

In 2020, her Chelsea goal against Arsenal was nominated for the FIFA Puskas Award.

Club career
Ingle began her football career with boys' team Vale Wanderers. Despite making an appeal to the Football Association of Wales (FAW), rules prevented Ingle from playing with the boys beyond the age of 12. She spent a year away from football and then had brief spells with Vale Wanderers' girls and Dinas Powys Ladies. This preceded the teenage Ingle's move to Cardiff City Ladies.

After a period in the reserves, Ingle broke into Cardiff's FA Women's Premier League team during season 2007–08. After winning the Welsh Cup twice with Cardiff, Ingle signed for WSL outfit Chelsea Ladies ahead of the 2012 campaign.

Chelsea manager Matt Beard deployed Ingle as a central defender and praised her impact after Chelsea's 2012 FA Women's Cup Final defeat to Birmingham: "Sophie Ingle, we initially brought in as a left back but you can see from her quality on the ball and distribution and reading of the game is good as well, she has created a few goals for us with balls in behind which something we haven’t had before."

In February 2014, Ingle left Chelsea and moved nearer to home by joining Bristol Academy. She rose to captain The Vixens, but the club were relegated after the 2015 season. Ingle became a transfer target for other clubs and decided to join Liverpool in December 2015: "Liverpool is a massive club and once I was aware of their interest there was only one team I wanted to sign for".

International career
Ingle was called-up to represent Wales at Under-17 level, and later rose to captain the Under-19 squad. Ingle won her first senior cap for Wales in a 2–1 World Cup qualifying defeat to Azerbaijan, played in Baku on 28 October 2009.

In December 2011, Ingle was named in the preliminary Team GB squad for the 2012 Olympics. She won her 50th cap for Wales in July 2014, during a 1–1 friendly draw with Scotland in Dumfries.

Wales manager Jayne Ludlow named Ingle the new national team captain ahead of the 2015 Istria Cup, replacing Jess Fishlock who was surprisingly dropped from the squad.

On 22 September 2020, Ingle played her 100th match for Wales against Norway during the UEFA Women's Euro 2021 qualifiers. On 27 May 2021 it was announced that Ingle had been selected as the only Welsh player in the Great Britain women's Olympic football team for the 2020 Olympics.

Career statistics

International
Statistics accurate as of match played 2 August 2021.

Honours 
Ingle was appointed Officer of the Order of the British Empire (OBE) in the 2023 New Year Honours for services to association football.

Club

Chelsea 

 FA Women's Super League: 2019–20
 FA Women's League Cup: 2019–20
 FA Community Shield: 2020

Individual 
 Liverpool Women's Player of the Season: 2017
 Liverpool Women's Players' Player of the Season: 2018
 FIFA Puskas Award Nominee: 2020

References

External links

 Profile at Chelsea F.C. Women
 
 

1991 births
Living people
Sportspeople from Barry, Vale of Glamorgan
Welsh women's footballers
Women's association football defenders
Women's association football midfielders
Chelsea F.C. Women players
Liverpool F.C. Women players
Bristol Academy W.F.C. players
Wales women's international footballers
Olympic footballers of Great Britain
FA Women's National League players
Women's Super League players
Welsh Premier Women's Football League players
FIFA Century Club
Footballers at the 2020 Summer Olympics
Officers of the Order of the British Empire